Turkish women in music may perform in one or more genres of music which are the Turkish folklore music, the Turkish classical music, popular music or Western classical music. Folklore music is the traditional music with Turkish lyrics (see türkü). Turkish classical music is actually the continuation of the Ottoman palace music which is also in Turkish. Turkish popular music is similar to western popular music (western melodies with Turkish or original lyrics, new compositions and  arranged form of folklore music).

Pop music

Singers
Hadise Açıkgöz (aka Hadise)
Esin Afşar
Hümeyra Akbay (aka Hümeyra)
Belkis Akkale
Demet Akalın
Behiye Aksoy
Sezen Aksu
Ayla Algan
Ayten Alpman
Funda Arar
Hülya Avşar
Aynur Aydın
Güliz Ayla
Safiye Ayla
Selda Bağcan
Gülşen Bayraktar (aka Gülşen)
Perihan Benli (aka Romalı Perihan)
Semiha Berksoy
İdil Biret
Nil Burak
Sibel Can
Hilal Cebeci
Ayla Çelik
Deniz Çelik (aka Bendeniz)
İzel Çeliköz (aka İzel) 
Göksel Demirpençe (aka Göksel)
İrem Derici
Ayla Dikmen
Gökçe Dincer (aka Gökçe)
Esmeray Diriker (aka Esmeray)
Beyza Durmaz
Nükhet Duru
Arzu Ece
Sibel Egemen
Candan Erçetin
Bengü Erden (aka Bengü)
Sertab Erener
Gülben Ergen
Bülent Ersoy
Muazzez Ersoy
Ceylan Ertem
Yonca Evcimik
Şebnem Ferah
Leyla Gencer
Sıla Gençoğlu (aka Sıla)
Işıl German
Tülay German
Ebru Gündeş
Burcu Güneş
Aslı Güngör
Seden Gürel
Nuray Hafiftaş
Yıldız Kaplan
Işın Karaca
Suna Kan
Gülden Karaböcek
Neşe Karaböcek
Nil Karaibrahimgil
Nezihe Kalkan (aka Nez)
Tülay Keçialan (aka Asya)
Deniz Kurtel
Şefika Kutluer
Aylin Livaneli
Linet Menaşi (aka Linet)
Zuhal Olcay
Ayşe Hatun Önal
Füsun Önal
Nazan Öncel
Merve Özbey
Zerrin Özer
Şebnem Paker
Ajda Pekkan
Nükhet Ruacan
Demet Sağıroğlu
Simge Sağın (aka Simge)
Ziynet Sali
Yeşim Salkım
Leman Sam
Şevval Sam
Aydilge Sarp (aka Aydilge)
Seda Sayan
Emel Sayın
Ece Seçkin
Deniz Seki
Pamela Spence (aka Pamela)
Seyyal Taner
Özlem Tekin
Yıldız Tilbe
Aleyna Tilki
Bahriye Tokmak (aka Kibariye)
Sibel Tüzün
Derya Uluğ
Semiha Yankı
Ebru Yaşar
Gönül Yazar
Hande Yener
Aşkın Nur Yengi
Deniz Atiye Yılmaz (aka Atiye)
Neşe Zara Yılmaz (aka Zara)
Nilüfer Yumlu (aka Nilüfer)
Tuğba Yurt
Işıl Yücesoy
Şenay Yüzbaşıoğlu (aka Şenay)
Zeynep Bastık

Groups
Balık Sisters (Didem and Sinem)
Cici Kızlar
Hepsi
Pekinel sisters

Turkish classical music

Composers
Leyla Saz

Players
Vecihe Daryal, qanun
Fahire Fersan, classical kemençe

Singers
Muazzez Abacı
Behiye Aksoy
Safiye Ayla
Bülent Ersoy
Muazzez Ersoy
Müzeyyen Senar
Nesrin Sipahi
Sevim Tanürek

Western classical music

Players
Anjelika Akbar, piano
Filiz Ali, piano
İdil Biret, piano
Ferhunde Erkin, piano
Verda Erman, piano
Şahan Arzruni, piano
Ani Kavafian, violin
Ida Kavafian, violin
Şefika Kutluer, flute
Gülsin Onay, piano
Pekinel sisters, piano
Ayşegül Sarıca, piano
Rüya Taner, piano
Veriko Tchumburidze, violin
Zeynep Üçbaşaran, piano
Verda Ün, piano

Singers
Evelyn Baghtcheban, opera
Semiha Berksoy, opera
Mesude Çağlayan, opera
Jaklin Çarkçı, opera
Selma Emiroğlu, opera
Saadet İkesus Altan, opera
Meral Menderes, opera
Elçin Sangu

Gallery

See also
Music of Turkey
Women
Musicians